Burke Building is a historic building along Escolta corner Burke, Binondo, Manila, Philippines. First built in 1919, it survived World War II and has gone major remodeling since. Named after philanthropist, William J. Burke, the building is also known as the location of the first elevator in Manila.

References

External links

Buildings and structures in Binondo
Office buildings in Metro Manila
Buildings and structures completed in 1739
1739 establishments in the Spanish Empire